Young and in the Way was a blackened crust band from Charlotte, North Carolina, formed in 2009. Their music was described as "cold, hard and loud." They were formerly signed to Deathwish Inc.

History
Since forming in 2009 the band have released both independently and through Antithetic Records, Headfirst Records and A389 Recordings. The band confirmed via their Facebook page that their new album When Life Comes to Death will be released worldwide by Deathwish Inc. in 2014.

In February 2018, members of Young and in the Way were accused of multiple allegations of sexual assault. The alleged crimes were first brought to light by the Detroit, Michigan venue Trumbullplex, citing three incidents dating back to mid-2014. This revelation resulted in the band being pulled from a few then-upcoming music festivals and also being dropped by their label Deathwish, before ultimately disbanding. In response to allegations, the band stated that they did not support what happened to the victims and denied any involvement, but chose to break up because they could not provide evidence to prove their innocence. In part of a social media post, the Young and in the Way stated: "We stand by what we said when we learned about this incident – no member of our band was responsible for this crime. Let us be very clear – our response to this accusation is not an attempt to discredit the victim, we believe her, we’re sorry this happened to her, and we support her. But it was not us."

Despite their breakup in 2018, Young and in the Way released a final album in November 2020 titled Ride Off and Die. It was originally leaked shortly after their breakup in 2018.

Members
Final lineup
 Kable Lyall – vocals (2009–2018)
 Randy Baucom – drums (2009–2018)
 Rick Contes – guitar (2009–2018)
 Chris Nolen – bass (2009–2018)
Previous members
Max Nattsblod (2016) – guitar (2013-2017)
Dustin Carpenter - bass (substituted 2016-2017)

Discography

Studio albums
 I Am Not What I Am (2011)
 When Life Comes to Death (2014)
 Ride Off and Die (2020)

EPs
 Newborn (2009)
 Amen (2010)
 Cloven Hoof (2010)
 V. Eternal Depression (2011)

Splits
 Split 7" w/ Torch Runner (2011)
 Split 7" w/ Moral Void (2013)
 Split 7" w/ Withdrawal (2013)
 Split 7" w/ Gatecreeper (2016)

Music videos
 "Times Are Cold" (2011)
 "The Gathering" (2012)
 "Be My Blood" (2014)
 "Final Dose" (2014)

References

External links
 
 Young and in the Way on Bandcamp

American black metal musical groups
American crust and d-beat groups
Heavy metal musical groups from North Carolina
Musical groups established in 2009
Deathwish Inc. artists
Hardcore punk groups from North Carolina
Musical groups disestablished in 2018